The Pursuit of Justice is a book written by Robert F. Kennedy and published in 1964. The book consists of 12 revamped speeches delivered by Kennedy during his tenure as United States Attorney General. It was reviewed by Judge Roger J. Kiley.

References 

Works by Robert F. Kennedy
1964 non-fiction books
Robert F. Kennedy